Shevri is a Marathi film made in 2006. The film is directed by Gajendra Ahire and produced by Neena Kulkarni.

Plot
Vidya Barve, is a divorced, working woman, sharing a rented flat with a roommate in Mumbai. Our film deals with one single night which Vidya is forced to spend on the streets of this city. As she ambles on the deserted roads waiting for morning, she's frightened, lonely, angry, confused. She keeps recalling her relationships as they stand today - Her estranged husband, her teenaged son staying with her mother in small town Nasik, her boss, her colleague, her roommate. Alternating between her encounters during this night and her past, the film finally sees a visibly confident Vidya coming to terms with her lot. And that is when dawn breaks... The title Shevri suggests an insignificant wisp of cotton, which is Vidya. An ordinary woman with ordinary dreams, leading a life which is now out of the ordinary for her. Her coming to terms with her state today and becoming present to her life is what gives an essence to the film.

"Shevri is an interesting film because of its innovative and intelligent cinematic narration by effective use of flashbacks" - Jury comment at the Pune International Film Festival 2007 where it won the best International Marathi Film Award.

Cast
Following table shows details of Cast for Shevri.

Prashant Dharia

Awards
 2007 - National Film Award for Best Feature Film in Marathi

References

External links
 

2000s Marathi-language films
2006 films
Films featuring a Best Supporting Actor National Film Award-winning performance
Best Marathi Feature Film National Film Award winners
Films directed by Gajendra Ahire